Jerome Bonaparte Holgate (1812–1893) is the name of the American author who wrote the dystopian novel A Sojourn in the City of Amalgamation, in the Year of Our Lord, 19-- (1835). He wrote this work under the pseudonym of Oliver Bolokitten. After his death in 1893, he was laid to rest in Riverside Cemetery in Defiance, Ohio.

Bibliography
A Sojourn in the City of Amalgamation, in the Year of Our Lord, 19--  New York : The Author (1835)
Key to A Historical, Genealogical, Biographical, Geographical, and Chronological Chart: On a Novel and Interesting Plan (1838)
Atlas of American History; on a Novel Plan: Comprising a Complete Synopsis of the Events from the Discovery of the American Continent by Columbus in 1492 to the Year 1842 (1842)
American genealogy : being a history of some of the early settlers of North America and their descendants, from their first emigration to the present time ...  (1848)
Beekman family records (1848)
Conversations on the Present Age of the World in Connection with Prophecy (1853)
Noachidæ; or, Noah and his descendants. (1860) 
Shortcomings of the Puritan church, and Reorganization of society (1863)

References

External links

1812 births
1893 deaths
Writers from Burlington, Vermont
American male novelists
19th-century American novelists
American science fiction writers
19th-century American male writers
Novelists from Vermont